Mohamed Belouizdad is a quarter of Algiers, Algeria in Algiers Province. The quarter was formerly known as Belcourt during the French colonisation period. It was renamed as Hamma-El Annasser after Algerian independence, before the present name Belouizdad was adopted in 1992 in honour of the Algerian militant and nationalist Mohamed Belouizdad who lived in the quarter.

Mohamed Belouizdad Street and Hassiba Ben Bouali Street are the two main arteries for the quarter that also has a seashore stretch on the Mediterranean coast. Important places in Belouizdad include the Hamma National Library, the Botanical Garden Hamma (pronounced Hadiqat at Tajareb, or Jardin d'essai in French), the Hamoud Boualem soft drinks factory and headquarters, the August 20, 1955 Stadium (in French Stade 20 août 1955) as well as Hotel Sofitel. The quarter also has a famous cave known as Cave Cervantes where the Spanish writer Miguel de Cervantes hid from the Turkish authorities but was recaptured when he famously attempted to flee back to Spain.

Belouizdad is served by 4 stations of the Algiers Metro, namely Jardin d'essai Station, Hamma Station in Belouizdad itself and Aïssat Idir Station and 1er Mai Station in the nearby Sidi M'Hamed municipality. The area is also served by two aerial tramway systems, the Téléphérique d'El Madania, inaugurated in 1956, and Téléphérique du Mémorial inaugurated in 1987 linking it to the Botanical Garden and the Martyrs' Memorial in Algiers that oversees the quarter. The intermodal Les Fusillés Station  at the eastern border of Belouizdad connects to all points east on the Algiers tramway.

The quarter is also home to two sports organisations, CR Belouizdad (Chabab Riadhi Belouizdad or just Belouizdad) and OMR El Annasser (Olympic Mostakbel Ruisseau El Annasser)

Notable people

Known personalities from the area include: 
Sidi M'hamed Bou Qobrine, theologian and Sufi
Mohamed Aïchaoui, journalist, militant activist, politician
Mohamed Belouizdad, militant activist, politician
Hocine Yahi, football player
Biyouna, comedian
Albert Camus, writer

References

Communes of Algiers Province